Jorge Lucey (16 March 1932 – 15 May 2012) was an Argentine water polo player. He competed in the men's tournament at the 1960 Summer Olympics.

References

External links
 

1932 births
2012 deaths
Argentine male water polo players
Olympic water polo players of Argentina
Water polo players at the 1960 Summer Olympics
Sportspeople from Buenos Aires